Sonu Ke Titu Ki Sweety is a 2018 Indian Hindi-language romantic comedy film written and directed by Luv Ranjan. Produced by Luv Films and T-Series Films, the film was written by Luv Ranjan and Rahul Mody and edited by Akiv Ali. It stars Kartik Aaryan, Nushrat Bharucha and Sunny Singh. The film was released theatrically on 23 February 2018.

Upon release, Sonu Ke Titu Ki Sweety became a surprise blockbuster and broke several box-office records for a low budget film with no established stars. It entered the 100 Crore Club in India net. The film grossed 152–156 crore in its lifetime theatrical run, emerging as a humongous box office success. It is one of the highest-grossing Bollywood films of 2018.

Plot
Titu is grief-stricken as his girlfriend Pihu refuses to talk to him. Sonu, his best friend tells him she is not meant for him, as Titu is loving and caring while Pihu is possessive and callous. Sonu gives an ultimatum to Titu to choose between Pihu and him and Titu chooses him, breaking up with Pihu.

Six months later, during a meal, the Sharmas tell Titu that a family is interested in getting him married to their caring and sensitive daughter, Sweety, who is seemingly the 'ideal partner'. Sonu finds this very fishy but admits to Titu that she seems nice. He later finds out Sweety was going to marry another man, Rahul but that didn't work out as she was dominating, possessive, and once even drunk and created a scene in Goa.

On the engagement night, Sonu begins warming up to the idea of Titu and Sweety's wedding. However, she reveals to him in person that she is a gold digger and challenges him she will throw him out of Titu's life and home very soon. Sonu confides in Titu's grandfather Ghasitaram about the revelation. They bet between themselves to see if he can save Titu from Sweety. Titu is now engaged to Sweety.

She changes their caretaker and walks in on Sonu making out with a girl. She manipulates the family members and Titu into buying and naming a house after them. She turns it into a vegetarian household and controls Ghasitaram by threatening to reveal his dirty lies to Titu's grandmother. Sonu foresees Titu's imminent downfall; to protect him, he plans a bachelor party for Titu in Amsterdam.

While in Amsterdam, Sonu arranges Pihu to "accidentally" run into them after convincing her that Titu is still in love with her and he wants to help them get back. They return to India with Pihu; Sonu is happy to see a bothered Sweety after witnessing the closeness between Titu and Pihu. But Sweety reveals to Pihu that it was Sonu who broke Titu and her up in the first place and that Sonu is using her. Titu learns the truth and turns Sonu away in anger.

Ghasitaram and Lalu volunteer to sort the situation but Sonu interjects saying Titu should decide for himself. Sonu helps prepare for the wedding but during the garland ceremony, he makes a final attempt and gives Titu the ultimatum again to choose between him and Sweety and walks away from the wedding in tears. Titu, in a fit of epiphany, reveals to Sweety that this is barely the second time he has ever seen Sonu cry, the first being three days after his mother's death when they were thirteen; his tears show what Titu means to him, and Titu firmly announces that if it is between Sonu or her, it will always be his best friend. The scene switches to Sweety standing in the mandap and coming to terms that her malicious tactics cannot always work.

After the narrow escape, Sonu, Titu, Ghasitaram, and Lalu are seen sitting and drinking by the pool, whilst Sonu discusses his own marriage plans, to the disgust of others.

Cast
 Kartik Aaryan as Sonu Sharma
 Sunny Singh as Titu Sharma
 Nushrratt Bharuccha as Sweety Sharma, the main antagonist 
 Ishita Raj Sharma as Pihu Khanna
 Alok Nath as Ghasitaram Sharma, Titu's grandfather
 Virendra Saxena as Lalwant "Lalu" Bansal, Ghasitaram's best friend and Rukmani's brother
 Madhumalti Kapoor as Rukmani Sharma, Titu's grandmother
 Ayesha Raza Mishra as Manju Sharma, Titu's mother
 Pawan Chopra as Dharam Sharma, Titu's father
 Deepika Amin as Renuka "Renu" Sharma, Sweety's mother
 Rajesh Jais as Parag Sharma, Sweety's father
 Sonnalli Seygall in a special appearance as Sonu's girlfriend
 Sakshi Malik in the song "Bom Diggy Diggy"
 Collins Twins in the song "Bom Diggy Diggy"
 Pritam Jaiswal as Babu, a househelper who is hired by Sweety but later shown the door

Production

Development
Luv Ranjan made the announcement about the film through his official Twitter account on 6 December 2016. The shooting for the film began on 12 December 2016 while the title of the film was officially announced by Kartik Aaryan, Nushrat Bharucha and Sunny Singh through a YouTube video on 16 June 2017.

Filming
The shooting of the film has been done in Delhi, Ghaziabad, Noida, Mumbai, Rishikesh and Georgia. The shooting of the film in Ghaziabad has been done in Rajnagar Sector 5. The shooting of this movie has also been done in Gurugram DLF CyberHub. Some of the scenes were shot in Noida at Mahagun Moderne and Mahagun Marvella.

Soundtrack

The music of the film has been composed by Rochak Kohli, Yo Yo Honey Singh, Amaal Mallik, Guru Randhawa, Zack Knight, Saurabh-Vaibhav and Rajat Nagpal while lyrics have been penned by Kumaar, Yo Yo Honey Singh, Swapnil Tiwari, Zack Knight, Guru Randhawa, Singhsta and Oye Sheraa. The score is composed by Hitesh Sonik. The video of the song, "Dil Chori", which is a remake of the Hans Raj Hans' song "Dil Chori Sada Ho Gaya" was released on YouTube on 26 December 2017. This song marks the comeback of Yo Yo Honey Singh after two years of suffering from bipolar disorder. The song "Subah Subah"  was sung by Arijit Singh, Prakriti Kakar and Amaal Mallik was released on 3 January 2018. The music of the song "Subah Subah" was produced by Latvian producer Tobu which was released by Tobu himself on YouTube with the name "Candyland". The song "Chhote Chhote Peg", which was a remake of the Hans Raj Hans' song "Dil Tote Tote Ho Gaya" from the movie Bichhoo, was sung by Yo Yo Honey Singh, Neha Kakkar and Navraj Hans, was released on 18 January 2018.

The song, "Bom Diggy Diggy", which is a party song, is a remake of the 2017 Punjabi-English song "Bom Diggy" by British-Pakistani singer Zack Knight and British-Indian singer Jasmin Walia, and the chorus samples a Bengali folk song. The song was released on 8 February 2018. The music album of the film was released by T-Series on 14 February 2018 on Valentines Day.

Box office 
Sonu Ke Titu Ki Sweety collected 156.46 crore worldwide.

India
In India, Sonu Ke Titu Ki Sweety grossed 6.42 crore nett on its opening day. It earned  and 10.81 crore in its next two days respectively, taking total opening weekend collection to 26.57 crore. It managed to hold in working days, subsequently collecting 45.94 crore in its first week. Sonu Ke Titu Ki Sweety entered the 100 Crore Club in its fourth week on 25th day and collected 8.88 crore in that week. It ran for a total of 63 days (nine weeks) in cinemas and collected 4.25 crore, 1.69 crore, 0.37 crore, 0.10 crore and 0.02 crore in its fifth, sixth, seventh, eighth and ninth week respectively, thus taking its total nett lifetime collection to 108.95 crore in India. Box Office India declared Sonu Ke Titu Ki Sweety a blockbuster. The gross collection of the film in India is 139.46 crore.

Reception
While some commentators praised the humour, some were critical of the misogynistic plot.

Rajeev Masand of News18 gave the film a rating of 3 out of 5 and said that, "Sonu Ke Titu Ki Sweety has a strange kind of earnestness in its juvenile ambitions. I was uncomfortable with its decidedly women-bashing stand, but I enjoyed the film's silly, relentless humor." Shubhra Gupta of The Indian Express gave the film 2 stars out of 5; she wrote that the film was "breezey enough", and provides some laughs, some of which escape involuntarily. She responded negatively to the film's misogyny: "Luv Ranjan's fourth feature is as simplistic and sexist as it has been right from his first." She was also critical of the performances of the central duo of Singh and Aaryan. Renuka Vyavahare of The Times of India gave the film a rating of 3.5 out of 5 saying that, "Despite its misogynistic nature, Ranjan's lighthearted approach to counter gender stereotypes in modern relationships makes his take fascinating." Sweta Kausal of Hindustan Times gave the film a rating of 1 out of 5 and said that, "Nushrat Barucha, Karthik Aryan and Sunny Singh return in an unfunny tale with misogyny as its reigning feature." Sameeksha of News18 gave the film a rating of 1.5 out of 5 saying that, "the film is a great entertainer in the anti-women genre, but sadly for Ranjan, it is not a proper category yet and thus the film deserved to called a sexist, 'eye-roll' worthy ride which will leave you frustrated and angry by the end of it.".

Awards and nominations

References

External links
 
 

T-Series (company) films
2018 films
2010s Hindi-language films
Films directed by Luv ranjan
2018 romantic comedy films
Films shot in Mumbai
Indian romantic comedy films
Hindi films remade in other languages
Films scored by Guru Randhawa
Films scored by Rajat Nagpal
Films scored by Amaal Mallik
Films scored by Yo Yo Honey Singh
Films scored by Rochak Kohli